Bryant Christopher Barnhill (born August 11, 1998) is an American professional stock car racing driver. He last competed part-time in the NASCAR Gander RV & Outdoors Truck Series, driving the Nos. 34 and 33 Toyota Tundras for Reaume Brothers Racing.

Racing career

Gander RV & Outdoors Truck Series
In 2018, Barnhill began his NASCAR career. He was initially scheduled to drive for Mike Harmon Racing at Iowa Speedway, but failed to qualify. He then ran the next race at Gateway Motorsports Park for Jordan Anderson Racing, and finished 31st after running only five laps due to engine problems.

In 2019, he joined Reaume Brothers Racing.

NASCAR K&N Pro Series West
Barnhill participated in the Iowa race in 2017. He drove the No. 34 Chevrolet for Jesse Iwuji and finished 33rd after starting 28th.

CARS Late Model Stock Tour
Barnhill started his racing career in 2015, where he has only ran the Myrtle Beach race both in his debut year and the following year. In 2015, he also attempted to run the first race at Kenly, but did not qualify.

In 2018, Barnhill ran the second race at Myrtle Beach in the No. 17 Chevrolet for his own team. He finished 20th after starting 25th.

Personal life
Barnhill is an avid Christian and graduated from Conway Christian School. He is a third-generation racing driver and has received coaching from former driver Chad McCumbee.

Motorsports career results

NASCAR
(key) (Bold – Pole position awarded by qualifying time. Italics – Pole position earned by points standings or practice time. * – Most laps led.)

Gander RV & Outdoors Truck Series

K&N Pro Series West

 Season still in progress
 Ineligible for series points

References

External links
 

Living people
1998 births
NASCAR drivers
Racing drivers from South Carolina
People from Conway, South Carolina